SingStar Guitar is a 2010 competitive karaoke and music video game, a spin-off of the karaoke SingStar series. The title was developed by London Studio for the PlayStation 3, and published by Sony Computer Entertainment. It allows the use of a third-party guitar controller such as those used in the Guitar Hero or Rock Band series.

Music

On-disc
The following track list is the line-up of music included in the release of SingStar Guitar: The German  and Spanish editions of the game includes some localised material. All of the in game mixes were done from original multi-tracks. The mixing work was done by a music production company in the UK, Nimrod Productions.

Downloadable content
The following songs in the SingStore have "Guitar add-ons" available:

References

External links
Official Page @ PlayStation.com

2010 video games
Karaoke video games
London Studio games
Multiplayer and single-player video games
PlayStation 3 games
PlayStation 3-only games
PlayStation Eye games
SingStar
Sony Interactive Entertainment games
Video games developed in the United Kingdom